The Fifth day of Peace, Italian title: Gott mit uns (written in German), is an Italo-Yugoslavian movie from 1970 about the 13 May 1945 German deserter execution in a Canadian-run POW camp in Amsterdam.

Synopsis
Two German deserters, Kriegsmarine Ensign Bruno Grauber (Franco Nero) and Army Corporal Reiner Schultz (Larry Aubrey) are captured by the Canadian Army at the end of World War II. They are interned in a Canadian-run POW camp where the senior German officer, Colonel Von Bleicher, is a career officer.  Their fellow German prisoners of war, led by Von Bleicher, discover that they are deserters. They are put through a formal military court martial organised by Von Bleicher and charged with cowardice. They are sentenced to death and are to be executed on the "fifth day of peace".  Von Bleicher pressures the Canadian camp commandant to allow the execution to be carried out and requests rifles and ammunition to carry out the sentence.

A Canadian general, Snow, persuades (but does not order) the Canadian camp commandant, Captain Miller, to allow the execution to be carried out for the higher purpose of preserving military discipline. He also motivates Miller with a promotion to major.

This movie is based on the true story of two German sailors, leading seaman Bruno Dorfer and machinist's mate Rainer Beck, both executed for desertion on May 13, 1945, after being found guilty of cowardice by fellow POWs.  The sentence was carried out by German POWs who were under Canadian command.

Casting
 Bud Spencer as Cpl. Jelinek
 Richard Johnson as Capt. John Miller
 Franco Nero as Ens. Bruno Grauber
 Larry Aubrey as Cpl. Reiner Schultz
 Helmuth Schneider as Col. von Bleicher (as Helmut Schneider)
 Michael Goodliffe as Gen. Snow
 Relja Bašić as Lt. George Romney
 T. P. McKenna as Nick
 Graham Armitage as Mark
 Emilio Delle Piane as Gleason
 Enrico Osterman as Trevor
 Renato Romano as Canadian Doctor
 Sven Lasta as Capt. Bosch
 Demeter Bitenc Major Brandt
 Oswaldo Ruggeri as Capt. Warner

External links 
 
 "Victims of Circumstance: The Execution of German Deserters by Surrendered German Troops Under Canadian Control in Amsterdam, May 1945 by Chris Madsen"

1970 films
1970s Italian-language films
English-language Italian films
English-language Yugoslav films
Films about capital punishment
Films about deserters
Films about miscarriage of justice
Films directed by Giuliano Montaldo
Films scored by Ennio Morricone
World War II films based on actual events
World War II prisoner of war films
Yugoslav World War II films
1970s Italian films
Italian World War II films
Italian war drama films
Yugoslav war drama films